Glass Slipper is a pioneering streamliner dragster.

Making her debut in 1957, Glass Slipper was created by Califironia drag racers Roy and Ed Cortopassi.  The workmanship was so good, she won "America's Most Beautiful Competition Car" at the 1957 Oakland Roadster Show.

Glass Slipper was a short-wheelbase front-engined digger with front hairpins, lakester-style wheel discs (Moon discs), covered frame rails, a closed cockpit, and exposed exhaust pipes, bearing a strong resemblance to a sprint car.  She wore the livery of Capitol Speed Shop.  She was powered by an injected small-block Chevy, distinguishing her from her blown contemporaries.  She recorded a standing kilometer of  under FIA International Acceleration Records at March Air Force Base in 1958.

After a fire subsequent to the record effort, in 1960, Glass Slipper reappeared with a GMC supercharger and Hilborn injection. She was retired in 1961.

In the 1990s, the car was restored.

Notes

1950s cars
1960s cars
Drag racing cars
Rear-wheel-drive vehicles